This is a list of Mexican television related events from 2013.

Events
15 December - Marcos Razo wins the third season of La Voz... México.

Debuts

Television shows

1970s
Plaza Sésamo (1972–present)

2010s
La Voz... México (2011–present)

Ending this year

Births

Deaths

See also
List of Mexican films of 2013
2013 in Mexico